Stella Nina McCartney  (born 13 September 1971) is an English fashion designer. She is a daughter of British singer-songwriter Paul McCartney and the late American photographer and animals rights activist Linda McCartney. Like her parents, McCartney is a firm supporter of animal rights, environmentalism, and is particularly known for her use of vegetarian and animal-free alternatives in her work. Since 2005, she has designed an activewear collection for Adidas.

Early life
McCartney was born on 13 September 1971 at King's College Hospital in Camberwell, London. She is named after her maternal great-grandmothers (both of Linda's grandmothers were named Stella). Her mother, Linda Eastman McCartney, was of Jewish ancestry. As a girl, McCartney travelled the globe with her parents and their group Wings, along with her siblings: older half-sister Heather (who was legally adopted by Paul), older sister Mary, and younger brother James. According to her father, the name of Wings was inspired by Stella's difficult delivery. As his daughter was being born by emergency caesarean section, Paul sat outside the operating room and prayed that she would be born 'on the wings of an angel'.

Despite their fame, the McCartneys wanted their children to live as normal of a life as possible, so Stella and her siblings attended local state schools in East Sussex, one of them being Bexhill College. McCartney has said that while attending state school, she was a victim of bullying yet had been a bully herself.

Career

Beginning
McCartney became interested in designing clothes as a youth. At the age of 13, she designed her first jacket. Three years later, she interned for Christian Lacroix, working on her first haute couture collection, honing her skills working for Edward Sexton (her father's Savile Row tailor) for a number of years.

McCartney studied her foundation at Ravensbourne College of Design and Communication, followed by Fashion Design at Central Saint Martins in the early 1990s, graduating in 1995. Her graduation collection was modelled for free by friends and supermodels Naomi Campbell, Yasmin Le Bon and Kate Moss, at the graduation runway show, presented to a song especially written by her father, "Stella May Day".

A lifelong vegetarian, McCartney uses no leather or fur in her designs. The Guardian described her in 2015 as a 'consistent and vocal' supporter of animal rights. Some of McCartney's designs have text that elaborates on her 'no animal' policy; one of her Adidas jackets carries a sleeve that says 'suitable for sporty vegetarians'. A pair of her vinyl and ultrasuede boots were marketed specifically as vegan-friendly, though her use of oil-based synthetics still raised ecological concerns.

Rise to prominence
In 1997, McCartney was named as the creative director of Chloé, a position she held until 2001.

In 2001, McCartney launched a fashion house under her name, in a joint venture with Gucci Group (now Kering), and presented her first collection in Paris. She now operates 51 freestanding stores in Manhattan's Soho, London's Mayfair, LA's West Hollywood, Paris's Palais Royal, Barcelona's Passeig de Gracia, Milan, Rome, Miami and Houston, among other locations.

In 2003, McCartney launched her first perfume, Stella. In January 2007, she launched a 100% organic skincare line, CARE, which includes seven products, from a cleansing milk made with lemon balm and apricot, to green tea and linden blossom floral water.

In 2008, McCartney launched a new lingerie line with Bendon Group. In November 2010, the Stella McCartney Kids collection was launched for newborns and children up to age 12.

 In June 2012, McCartney invited the Soul Rebels Brass Band to perform at her 2013 spring fashion presentation at the New York Marble Cemetery in New York City. Other guests invited to the party included Anne Hathaway, Jim Carrey, Anna Wintour, Annie Leibovitz, Lauren Hutton, Amy Poehler, Solange Knowles, P'Trique, Greta Gerwig and André Leon Talley. Also in 2012, McCartney was part of The Sustainable Fashion Handbook.

In November 2016, McCartney launched her first menswear collection, made up of many athleisure, pyjama-like casual outfits. She said her father and comedian Jethro inspired the collection.

In April 2018, after 17 years of partnership with Kering, McCartney purchased its stake in her company and took full control of her global fashion empire. The following year, she signed a strategic partnership with LVMH. She designed the wedding reception dress worn by Meghan Markle, and later created 46 replicas of it (23 in lily white and 23 in onyx black) for her "Made With Love" capsule collection, each priced at £3,500.

On 15 October 2018, McCartney announced the launch of the Stella McCartney Cares Foundation, a charity dedicated to breast cancer. (McCartney's mother Linda died of breast cancer in 1998.) The charity will donate 1,000 of the brand's Louis Listening post-operative mastectomy compression bras to women undergoing breast cancer treatment.

On 21 November 2021, McCartney launched "The Beatles: Get Back" a collection inspired by the Beatles.

Collaborations

McCartney launched a joint-venture line with Adidas, establishing a long-term partnership with the corporation in September 2004. This was a sports performance collection for women.

In January 2010, McCartney announced she would be collaborating with Disney to create a jewellery collection inspired by Alice in Wonderland. In July of the same year, together with People for the Ethical Treatment of Animals (PETA) and eco-designer Atom cianfarani, McCartney worked to petition the British Ministry of Defence to cease the use of Canadian Black Bears as the fur for their guards' hats; the military is yet to make the change.

In July 2011, McCartney participated at the catwalk of The Brandery fashion show in Barcelona.

In December 2018, McCartney announced the launch of a new fashion industry charter for climate action, in collaboration with the United Nations, to help fashion companies welcome sustainable business practices.

In August 2019, American singer-songwriter Taylor Swift teamed up with McCartney to release a fashion line inspired by Swift's seventh studio album Lover, the project carrying the title "Stella X Taylor Swift".

Team GB
In September 2010, McCartney was appointed Team GB's Creative Director for the 2012 Olympics by Adidas – the first time in the games' history that a leading fashion designer designed the apparel for a country's team across all competitions for both the Olympic and the Paralympic Games. In March 2012, the Team GB kit was publicly displayed. McCartney continued in this role for the 2016 Summer Olympics.

Honours, awards and media
McCartney received the VH1/Vogue Designer of the Year award in 2000 in New York. Her father Paul presented the award to her; she thanked him in her acceptance speech and dedicated the award to her late mother Linda. This was followed by the Woman of Courage Award for work against cancer at the prestigious Unforgettable Evening event (2003, Los Angeles), the Glamour Award for Best Designer of the Year (2004, London), the Star Honoree at the Fashion Group International Night of the Stars (2004, New York), the Organic Style Woman of the Year Award (2005, New York), the Elle Style Award for Best Designer of the Year Award (2007, London), Best Designer of the Year at the British Style Awards (2007, London), Best Designer of The Year at the Spanish Elle Awards (2008, Barcelona), and the Green Designer of the Year at the ACE Awards (2008, New York).

In 2009, she was honoured by the NRDC, featured in the Time 100 and recognised as Glamour Woman of the Year. In November 2011, she was presented with the Red Carpet Award by the British Fashion Council; and in the 2013 New Year Honours, she was appointed Officer of the Order of the British Empire (OBE) for services to fashion.

In 2012, McCartney was among the British cultural icons selected by artist Sir Peter Blake to appear in a new version of his artwork – the album cover for The Beatles' Sgt. Pepper's Lonely Hearts Club Band – to celebrate the British cultural figures of his life that he most admires. In February 2013 she was assessed as one of the 100 most powerful women in the United Kingdom by Woman's Hour on BBC Radio 4.

In June 2017, McCartney appeared on BBC Radio 4's Desert Island Discs, selecting "Road to Nowhere" by Talking Heads and "Blackbird" by the Beatles, and her favourite "God Only Knows" by the Beach Boys. She would later receive the Special Recognition Award for Innovation at the 2017 Fashion Awards

She was appointed Commander of the Order of the British Empire (CBE) in the 2022 Birthday Honours for services to fashion and sustainability.

Personal life
McCartney married British publisher Alasdhair Willis on 30 August 2003 at Mount Stuart House on the Isle of Bute. Her wedding dress was an updated version of her mother's wedding dress from 1969. Willis works as creative director of shoewear brand Adidas.

McCartney and Willis have four children: sons Miller Alasdhair James Willis (born 2005) and Beckett Robert Lee Willis (born 2008) and daughters Bailey Linda Olwyn Willis (born 2006) and Reiley Dilys Stella Willis (born 2010). Her children appeared with her on the cover of Vogue.

McCartney has a younger half-sister, Beatrice Milly McCartney, born on 28 October 2003 to her father and his second wife, Heather Mills.

In 2018, McCartney said: "When my mum died, Dad, my brother and I went to see the Maharishi... I had quite a reaction that I didn't feel in control of. I possibly suppressed my emotions and I started having panic attacks, physical reactions to that loss." She said that transcendental meditation made an almost instantaneous difference in her ability to cope. "It really did help me at a time when I really needed some help... I didn't want to part with money for it. But, you know, it's probably the best investment I ever made."

See also
 List of animal rights advocates

Bibliography
Vegan Cookery
McCartney, Linda (with Paul, Mary, and Stella McCartney). Linda McCartney's Family Kitchen: Over 90 Plant-Based Recipes to Save the Planet and Nourish the Soul. (Voracious/Little, Brown, and Co., 2021)

References

External links

 Linda McCartney's Family Kitchen - In Conversation with Paul, Mary and Stella (Paul McCartney Official Channel) - Interview, Oct 6, 2021

1971 births
Living people
21st-century English businesspeople
21st-century English businesswomen
Adidas people
Alumni of Central Saint Martins
Alumni of Ravensbourne University London
British women fashion designers
English animal rights activists
English businesspeople in fashion
English fashion designers
English people of American descent
English people of German-Jewish descent
English people of Irish descent
English people of Russian-Jewish descent
English women activists
High fashion brands
Jewish fashion designers
Stella
Commanders of the Order of the British Empire
People from Camberwell
People from Lambeth
Plant-based diet advocates